is a 2016 Japanese film, featuring a crossover between the casts and characters of the Super Sentai television series Shuriken Sentai Ninninger and Ressha Sentai ToQger, including the debut appearance of the main cast of Doubutsu Sentai Zyuohger. Ryota Yamasato of the owarai duo Nankai Candies guest stars as the movie villain Dark Doctor Mavro. It was released nationally in Japan on January 23, 2016.

Story
The Ninningers come across a new enemy, Dark Doctor Mavro, a remnant of the Shadow Line, who created his own, evil version of Aka Ninger serving under him by stealing the real Aka Ninger's Nintality, and because of it, Takaharu's life is now in danger. All hope seems lost until the Ninningers meet the ToQgers, who fought and defeated the Shadow Line in the past, and it's up to them to join forces in order to overcome this new crisis.

Plot

Cast
: 
: 
: 
: 
: 
: 
: , 
: , 
: , 
: , 
: , 
: 
: 
: 
: 
: 
: 
: 

Voice cast
: 
: 
: 
Ninninger Equipment Voice: 
, ToQger Equipment Voice: 
: 
: 
: 
: 
: 
: 
: 
:

Reception

References

External links
(In Japanese)
 for Toei Company

2010s Super Sentai films
Crossover tokusatsu films
2016 films
Films scored by Kousuke Yamashita